The Cheese Shop, Louth is an artisan delicatessen situated in Louth, England, known for its large selection of artisan foods, especially cheese. The Cheese Shop has been featured in national newspapers such as The Daily Telegraph and its magazine and The Guardian, local radio and television on BBC Lincolnshire and BBC Look North, and national television episodes in The Hairy Bikers' Food Tour of Britain.

The shop supplies public houses and restaurants in the surrounding area, and stocks locally produced cheeses, including Lincolnshire Poacher and Lincolnshire Red, and Cote Hill Blue and Yellow cheeses.

In 2011 The Cheese Shop won the food category in "The Best Small Food Shops in Britain Awards", run by Mary Portas and The Daily Telegraph, being chosen out of a shortlist of three by The Daily Telegraph'''s food columnist Rose Prince.

Awards
Included in Rose Prince's Good Food Producers Guide 2010
Voted number 1 in "The Best Small Shops in Britain Awards" in the food category, by The Daily Telegraph'', in association with Mary Portas and Rose Prince

See also

 List of delicatessens

References

External links
 Official Website

Companies based in Lincolnshire
Companies based in the Borough of North Lincolnshire
Food and drink companies of England
Dairy products companies of the United Kingdom
Retail companies established in 2007
2007 establishments in England
Food retailers of the United Kingdom
Louth, Lincolnshire
Cheese retailers
Delicatessens in the United Kingdom
British companies established in 2007